
Gmina Oborniki is an urban-rural gmina (administrative district) in Oborniki County, Greater Poland Voivodeship, in west-central Poland.

Villages
Apart from the town of Oborniki, Gmina Oborniki contains the villages and settlements of Antonin, Bąblin, Bąblinek, Bąbliniec, Bębnikąt, Bogdanowo, Chrustowo, Dąbrówka Leśna, Gołaszyn, Gołębowo, Górka, Kiszewko, Kiszewo, Kowalewko, Kowanówko, Kowanowo, Łukowo, Lulin, Maniewo, Marszewiec, Nieczajna, Niemieczkowo, Nowe Osowo, Nowołoskoniec, Objezierze, Ocieszyn, Pacholewo, Podlesie, Popówko, Popowo, Przeciwnica, Rożnowo, Sepno, Sławienko, Ślepuchowo, Słonawy, Stobnica, Świerkówki, Sycyn, Urbanie, Uścikowiec, Uścikowo, Wargowo, Wychowaniec, Wymysłowo, Wypalanki, Żerniki and Żukowo.

Neighbouring gminas
Gmina Oborniki is bordered by the gminas of Murowana Goślina, Obrzycko, Połajewo, Rogoźno, Rokietnica, Ryczywół, Suchy Las and Szamotuły.

References
Polish official population figures 2006

Oborniki
Oborniki County